The 2012 Troy Trojans football team represented Troy University during the 2012 NCAA Division I FBS football season. They were led by 22nd-year head coach Larry Blakeney and played their home games at Veterans Memorial Stadium. They were a member of the Sun Belt Conference. They finished the season 5–7, 3–5 in Sun Belt play to finish in a tie for sixth place.

Schedule

Game summaries

@ UAB

Louisiana–Lafayette

Mississippi State

@ North Texas

@ South Alabama

WKU

FIU

@ Florida Atlantic

@ Tennessee

Navy

Arkansas State

@ Middle Tennessee

References

Troy
Troy Trojans football seasons
Troy Trojans football